Vladimir Mikhailovich Lopukhin (23 May 1952 – 26 May 2020) was a Russian economist and politician. He served as 1st Minister of Fuel and Energy of the Russian Federation from 1991 to 1992.

Life
Lopukhin was born in Moscow and graduated from the Faculty of Economics of Moscow State University in 1975. From November 1991 until June 1992, he held the position of 1st Minister of Fuel and Energy of the Russian Federation. He was appointed as an adviser to Russian Prime Minister Yegor Gaidar in the fall of 1992, and also worked as partner of Lazard from 1992 until 1996.

Lopukhin died in Moscow in May 2020, three days after his 68th birthday, after contracting COVID-19 during the COVID-19 pandemic in Russia.

References

1952 births
2020 deaths
Politicians from Moscow
Economists from Moscow
Energy ministers of Russia
Moscow State University alumni
20th-century Russian politicians
20th-century  Russian economists
Deaths from the COVID-19 pandemic in Russia
Soviet economists